This is a list of newspapers in Indonesia.

National newspapers 
All newspapers listed below are in Indonesian.

General newspapers

Business newspapers

Sports newspapers

Tabloids

Local newspapers 
All newspapers listed below are in Indonesian.

Newspaper chain 
Note: Some members of these chain are shown below this sub-section.
 Jawa Pos News Network – owned by Jawa Pos Group
 Sumatera Ekspres Group
 Riau Pos Group
 Fajar Indonesia Network
 Tribun Network – owned by Kompas Gramedia

List of newspapers 
(*) indicates a local insertion of Jawa Pos

 
Aceh
 Rakyat Aceh
 Serambi Indonesia

North Sumatra
 Analisa
 Metro Siantar
 Pos Metro Medan
 Sinar Indonesia Baru
 Sumut Pos
 Tribun Medan
 Waspada

West Sumatra
 Haluan
 Padang Ekspres
 Pos Metro Padang
 Rakyat Sumbar
 Singgalang

Riau
 Haluan Riau
 Riau Pos
 Tribun Pekanbaru
 Metro Riau

Riau Island
 Haluan Kepri
 Pos Metro Batam
 Tanjungpinang Pos
 Batam Pos
 Tribun Batam

Jambi
 Bungo Independent
 Bute Ekspres
 Jambi Ekspres
 Jambi Independent
 Metro Jambi
 Tribun Jambi

South Sumatra
 Linggau Pos
 Palembang Independent
 Palembang Ekspres
 Pos Metro Palembang
 Radar Palembang
 Rakyat Palembang
 Sriwijaya Post
 Sumatera Ekspres
 Tribun Sumsel
 Prabumulih Pos

Bangka Belitung
 Babel Pos
 Bangka Pos
 Pos Belitung

Bengkulu
 Bengkulu Ekspress
 Curup Ekspress
 Radar Lebong
 Radar Kepahiang
 Radar Seluma
 Radar Utara
 Rakyat Bengkulu
 Rakyat Benteng

Lampung
 Lampung Ekspress
 Lampung Post
 Radar Lampung
 Radar Lambar
 Radar Lamsel
 Radar Lamteng
 Tribun Lampung

Banten
 Banten Pos
 Banten Raya
 Radar Banten
 Tangerang Ekspres
 Tangsel Pos

Special Capital Region of Jakarta
 Poskota
 Warta Kota

West Java
 Cianjur Ekspres
 Galamedia
 Pasundan Ekspres
 Pikiran Rakyat
 Radar Bandung
 Radar Bekasi
 Radar Bogor
 Radar Cirebon
 Radar Depok
 Radar Karawang
 Radar Sukabumi
 Radar Tasikmalaya
 Sumedang Ekspres
 Tribun Jabar

Central Java
 Semarang Post
 Suara Merdeka
 Solopos
 Tribun Jateng
 Wawasan
 Radar Tegal
 Radar Semarang*
 Radar Pekalongan
 Radar Banyumas
 Radar Kudus*
 Radar Solo*

Special Region of Yogyakarta
 Harian Jogja
 Kedaulatan Rakyat
 Koran Merapi
 Minggu Pagi (weekly)
 Radar Jogja*
 Tribun Jogja

East Java
 Malang Post
 Memorandum
 Radar Banyuwangi*
 Radar Mojokerto*
 Radar Jember*
 Radar Madiun*
 Radar Bromo*
 Radar Kediri*
 Radar Bojonegoro*
 Radar Malang*
 Radar Madura*
 Radar Tulungagung*
 Radar Semeru*
 Radar Surabaya
 Surabaya Pagi
 Surya

Bali
 Bali Post
 Tribun Bali
 Radar Bali

West Nusa Tenggara
 Lombok Post
 Suara NTB
 Radar Sumbawa

East Nusa Tenggara
 Pos Kupang
 Timor Ekspres

West Kalimantan
 Kapuas Pos
 Metro Pontianak
 Pontianak Post
 Tribun Pontianak

Central Kalimantan
 Kalteng Pos
 Radar Sampit
 Tabengan

East Kalimantan
 Balikpapan Pos
 Bontang Post
 Kaltim Post
 Koran Kaltim
 Samarinda Pos
 Tribun Kaltim

South Kalimantan
 Banjarmasin Post
 Kalselpos
 Radar Banjarmasin

North Kalimantan
 Radar Tarakan

North Sulawesi
 Bolmong Raya
 Koran Manado
 Manado Post
 Radar Manado
 Tribun Manado

South Sulawesi
 Berita Kota Makassar
 Fajar
 Palopo Pos
 Pare Pos
 Rakyat Sulsel
 Radar Bone
 Radar Selatan
 Tribun Timur
 Ujungpandang Ekspres

Southeast Sulawesi
 Buton Pos
 Kendari Ekspres
 Kendari Pos
 Rakyat Sultra

Central Sulawesi
 Luwuk Post
 Palu Ekspres
 Radar Sulteng
 Metro Sulawesi

Gorontalo
 Gorontalo Post
 Radar Gorontalo

West Sulawesi
 Radar Sulbar

Maluku
 Ambon Ekspres
 Siwalima

North Maluku
 Malut Post

West Papua
 Radar Papua
 Radar Sorong

Papua
 Cenderawasih Pos
 Koran Jubi (weekly)
 Radar Timika

Foreign-language newspapers

Chinese 
 Harian Indonesia (印度尼西亞日报)
 Harian Inhua (印华日报)
 Harian Nusantara (千岛日报)
 Indonesia Shang Bao (印度尼西亞商报 / 印尼商报)
 Yinni Guoji Ribao (International Daily News) (国际日报)

English 
 International Bali Post
 The Bali Times
 The Jakarta Post
 Independent Observer

Japanese 
 The Daily Jakarta Shimbun (じゃかるた新聞)

Defunct and historical newspapers

Malay/Indonesian

Contemporary (1945–present)
 Bernas (Yogyakarta) – ceased publication in 2018, continued online
 Harian Bola – daily version of Bola
 Harian Pelita  (Jakarta) – ceased publication in 2019, continued online
 Indonesia Raya (Jakarta)
 Indopos (Jakarta) – ceased publication in 2020, continued online
 Republika  (Jakarta) – ceased publication in 2022, continued online
 Sinar Harapan  (Jakarta) – ceased publication in 2015, continued online
 Suara Pembaruan (Jakarta)
 Sin Po (Jakarta, Indonesian-language edition)
 Suara Karya – continued online
 Surabaya Post (East Java)
 Warta Bhakti (Jakarta)

Historical (defunct before 1945)
 Djawa Tengah (Central Java)
 Han Po (Palembang)
 Medan Prijaji
 Neratja
 Pemandangan
 Perniagaan
 Selompret Melajoe (Central Java)
 Sikap
 Tjahaja Timoer (East Java)
 Tjhoen Tjhioe
 Warna Warta (Central Java)

Party-owned 
 Abadi (Masyumi)
 Harian Rakjat (Communist Party of Indonesia)
 Pedoman (Indonesian Socialist Party)
 Suara Katolik (Catholic Party)
 Suluh Indonesia (National Party of Indonesia)

Chinese 
 Hua Chi Pao
 Keng Po (競報)
 Sin Po (新报, Chinese-language edition)

Dutch 
 Bataviaasch Nieuwsblad
 De Indische Courant
 De Locomotief
 Het Vrije Woord
 Nieuws van den Dag voor Nederlandsch-Indië
 Soerabaijasch Handelsblad

English 
 Bali Daily
 Indonesia Observer
 Jakarta Globe – ceased publication in 2015, continued online
 Times of Indonesia

See also
 List of magazines in Indonesia
 Media of Indonesia

Footnotes

Further reading
 Hemant Shah, and Gati Gayatri. "Development News in Elite and Non-Elite Newspapers in Indonesia" Journalism & Mass Communication Quarterly (June 1994) 71#2 pp: 411-420 doi: 10.1177/107769909407100214
 Hill, David T. The Press in New Order Indonesia (Equinox Publishing, 2006) online
 Hill, David T.  Journalism and Politics in Indonesia: A Critical Biography of Mochtar Lubis (1922-2004) as Editor and Author (2010)
 Isa, Zubaidah. "Printing and publishing in Indonesia, 1602-1970' (PhD Dissertation, Indiana University, 1972.)

Indonesia
Newspapers